Lehigh Township is a township in Carbon County, Pennsylvania. It is part of Northeastern Pennsylvania.

The population was 479 at the time of the 2010 census.

History
The area of Carbon County, Pennsylvania that is known today as Lehigh Township was considered to be part of Lausanne Township from 1808 until 1875. It was during that year that it became known as Lehigh Township.

Early history
In 1808, a tract of forested land near the Lehigh River was owned by members of the Moravian church. In 1824, Lehigh Coal and Navigation Company executives purchased the lumber rights to that land and built four sawmills, housing for its workers and a town store on the land in order to establish a lumber harvesting operation to support the company's coal barge construction efforts. That first town was known as Lowrytown; it would later be known as Rockport.

Geography
The township is located in north-central Carbon County and is bordered to the north partially by Luzerne County.

The township's villages include Leslie Run and Rockport. The borough of Weatherly is on the western side of the township but is a separate municipality.

The township has a warm-summer humid continental climate (Dfb) and the hardiness zones are 5b and 6a. Average monthly temperatures in Rockport range from 25.2 °F in January to 69.9 °F in July.

Demographics

As of the census of 2000, there were 527 people, 193 households, and 156 families residing in the township.

The population density was 20.1 people per square mile (7.8/km). There were 237 housing units at an average density of 9.0/sq mi (3.5/km).

The racial makeup of the township was 97.91% White, 1.71% Native American, 0.19% Asian, and 0.19% from two or more races. Hispanic or Latino of any race were 0.76% of the population.

There were 193 households, out of which 31.6% had children under the age of eighteen living with them; 66.8% were married couples living together, 8.8% had a female householder with no husband present, and 18.7% were non-families. 16.6% of all households were made up of individuals, and 7.8% had someone living alone who was sixty-five years of age or older.

The average household size was 2.66 and the average family size was 2.92.

In the township the population was spread out, with 24.1% under the age of eighteen, 6.1% from eighteen to twenty-four, 26.6% from twenty-five to forty-four, 27.3% from forty-five to sixty-four, and 15.9% who were sixty-five years of age or older. The median age was forty-one years.

For every one hundred females, there were 90.3 males. For every one hundred females who were aged eighteen and over, there were 95.1 males.

The median income for a household in the township was $40,000, and the median income for a family was $43,333. Males had a median income of $32,083 compared with that of $26,042 for females.

The per capita income for the township was $17,883.

Roughly 8.0% of families and 10.8% of the population were living below the poverty line, including 19.8% of those who were under the age of eighteen and 9.3% of those who were aged sixty-five or over.

Transportation
 

No numbered highways pass through Lehigh Township. Main thoroughfares through the township include Buck Mountain Road, Lehigh Gorge Drive, Leslie Run Road and Rockport Road.

During the nineteenth century, the Commonwealth of Pennsylvania built the first road through what would ultimately become Lehigh Township. A state road, it began at the segment of the Lehigh and Susquehanna Turnpike where the Spring Mountain House was located, and proceeded through the borough of Weatherly and on to White Haven.

In 1840, construction of the White Haven and Lausanne Turnpike was begun with work on the turnpike segment between the Compton House to Morrison's finished in 1841.

The Lehigh Valley Railroad and the Philadelphia and Reading Railroad also established lines in the township during this century.

References

Populated places established in 1875
Townships in Carbon County, Pennsylvania
Townships in Pennsylvania